Vilmos Melczer (born 25 February 1986 in Budapest) is a Hungarian football player who currently plays for Érdi VSE.

References

EUFO
HLSZ
UEFA

1986 births
Living people
Footballers from Budapest
Hungarian footballers
Association football midfielders
MTK Budapest FC players
BFC Siófok players
Soroksári TE footballers
Budaörsi SC footballers
Mezőkövesdi SE footballers
Zalaegerszegi TE players
Dunaújváros PASE players
FC Ajka players
Nemzeti Bajnokság I players